Jennings is a city in St. Louis County, Missouri, United States. Per the 2020 census, the population was 12,895.

History 
The city was named after James Jennings, a farmer and merchant who moved to the area from Virginia with his family and retinue of slaves in 1839.  In 1855, a railway was constructed which bisected the original Jennings property.  Apparently the first commercial concern originating in the area was the Seed Dry Plate Company in 1883, which left for Rochester, New York around 1911 after its purchase by Eastman Kodak.  The city benefited from the economic boom following World War II and was incorporated (with state and county administrations) in 1946.

Geography
Jennings is located at  (38.721100, -90.261428).

Demographics

2020 census

Note: the US Census treats Hispanic/Latino as an ethnic category. This table excludes Latinos from the racial categories and assigns them to a separate category. Hispanics/Latinos can be of any race.

2010 census
At the 2010 census there were 14,712 people, 5,847 households and 3,782 families living in the city. The racial makeup of the city was 89.8% African American, 8.5% White, 0.1% Native American, 0.2% Asian, 0.2% from other races, and 1.1% from two or more races. Hispanic or Latino of any race were 0.6%.

Of the 5,847 households, 36.4% had children under the age of 18 living with them, 22.4% were married couples living together, 36.0% had a female householder with no husband present, 6.3% had a male householder with no wife present, and 35.3% were non-families. 31.2% of households were one person and 10.4% were one person aged 65 or older. The average household size was 2.51 and the average family size was 3.13.

The median age was 35.2 years. 27% of residents were under the age of 18; 10.3% were between the ages of 18 and 24; 24.3% were from 25 to 44; 27.7% were from 45 to 64; and 10.7% were 65 or older. The gender makeup of the city was 44.5% male and 55.5% female.

2000 census
At the 2000 census there were 15,469 people, 6,174 households and 4,081 families living in the city. The racial make-up was 19.32% White, 78.58% African American, 0.10% Native American, 0.38% Asian, 0.03% Pacific Islander, 0.19% from other races, and 1.40% from two or more races. Hispanic or Latino of any race were 0.73%.

Of the 6,174 households, 35.3% had children under the age of 18 living with them, 29.2% were married couples living together, 31.5% had a female householder with no husband present, and 33.9% were non-families. 30.4% of households were one person and 11.6% were one person aged 65 or older. The average household size was 2.50 and the average family size was 3.12.

The age distribution was 30.4% under the age of 18, 9.0% from 18 to 24, 29.2% from 25 to 44, 20.3% from 45 to 64, and 11.1% 65 or older. The median age was 33 years. For every 100 females, there were 79.5 males. For every 100 females age 18 and over, there were 72.2 males.

The median household income was $29,196 and the median family income  was $33,761. Males had a median income of $28,697 and females $25,013. The per capita income was $15,820. About 16.0% of families and 19.0% of the population were below the poverty line, including 28.3% of those under age 18 and 14.6% of those age 65 or over.

Public safety
The City of Jennings contracts with the St. Louis County Police Department to provide professional police services to the city.

The City of Jennings Police Department was disbanded by the city in 2011 due to corruption within the department, including cases of missing money.

Jennings has its own Fire Department that protects the city with 16 full-time firefighters. Jennings FD regularly backs up Northeast Ambulance & Fire Protection District on mutual-aid calls.

References

External links
 
 Jennings Historical Society; the site is no longer active an was last productively archived 27 April 2016 at the Internet Archive.

Cities in St. Louis County, Missouri
Cities in Missouri
Populated places established in 1946
1946 establishments in Missouri